CHNM may refer to:

CHNM-DT, a television station also known as OMNI British Columbia
Center for History and New Media, a research center at George Mason University